Brett Clark Connon (born 29 August 1996) is a rugby union player for Newcastle Falcons in Premiership Rugby. His primary position is fly-half; he has also featured at fullback.

Born in Carlisle, England, he qualifies for  through his father and has represented Ireland under 20s.

Career
Connon started playing rugby around 6 years old for his local club Carlisle and also played for his school Austin Friars.  He joined Newcastle Falcons academy at 15 and was identified by the IRFU's exiles programme and played for Ireland's under 18 team.  He made his debut for Newcastle's first team on 14 October 2016 against the Ospreys in a European Rugby Challenge Cup match.  On 10 March 2019, with the final kick of the match, Connon scored the winning penalty for Newcastle against Wasps.

References

1996 births
Living people
Newcastle Falcons players
Rugby union fly-halves
Rugby union players from Carlisle, Cumbria